WYJJ (97.7 MHz, "JJ 97.7") is an FM radio station broadcasting an urban adult contemporary format. Licensed to Trenton, Tennessee, United States, the station serves the Jackson, Tennessee area. The station is currently owned by Forever Media through Forever South Licenses, LLC.

History
The station was assigned the call sign WLOT on May 10, 1983. On February 15, 1993, the station changed its call sign to WWEZ, on December 11, 2000, to WTNE-FM, on September 23, 2009, to WTGP, and on September 15, 2012, to the current WYJJ.

On September 15, 2012, WTGP changed its format from contemporary Christian (as "The Dove") to urban adult contemporary, branded as "JJ 97.7" under the new call letters WYJJ.

Previous logo

References

External links

YJJ
Radio stations established in 1983
Urban adult contemporary radio stations in the United States